William Kennedy Fitzsimmons (31 January 1909 – 21 February 1992) was a Unionist politician in Northern Ireland.

Born in Belfast, Fitzsimmons studied at Skegoneill National School and Belfast Technical College. He became a domestic engineer, and in 1948 was appointed as a Belfast Water Commissioner, serving as chairman of the Commissioners in 1954–55. In 1951, he became a justice of the peace.

Fitzsimmons was also an active member of the Ulster Unionist Party and was the President of Duncairn Unionist Association. He was elected to the Parliament of Northern Ireland at a by-election in 1956, representing Belfast Duncairn. In 1961, he was made Assistant Parliamentary Secretary to the Ministry of Finance, an assistant whip position. He also became Parliamentary Secretary to the Ministry of Commerce. He was then rotated through a series of Parliamentary Secretary positions, serving with the Ministry of Home Affairs from 1963 to 1964, the Ministry of Health and Local Government from 1964 to 1966 and also the Ministry of Development for a period in 1965.

In April 1965, Fitzsimmons was finally appointed to a Cabinet position, becoming Minister of Education. He moved to become Minister of Development in 1966, back to Education in 1968 and finally served as Minister of Health and Social Services from 1969 until the Parliament was prorogued in 1972.

In 1968, Fitzsimmons' daughter married a Roman Catholic. As a result, he resigned from the Orange Order.  At the 1969, former independent Unionist Member of Parliament Norman Porter stood against Fitzsimmons as a candidate whose opposition to Catholicism was in no doubt, but Fitzsimmons held his seat.

At the Darlington Conference of 1973, Fitzsimmons served on the small Unionist team. Later in the year, he decided not to stand in the Northern Ireland Assembly election.

References

|-

1909 births
1992 deaths
Ulster Unionist Party members of the House of Commons of Northern Ireland
Members of the House of Commons of Northern Ireland 1953–1958
Members of the House of Commons of Northern Ireland 1958–1962
Members of the House of Commons of Northern Ireland 1962–1965
Members of the House of Commons of Northern Ireland 1965–1969
Members of the House of Commons of Northern Ireland 1969–1973
Northern Ireland Cabinet ministers (Parliament of Northern Ireland)
Northern Ireland junior government ministers (Parliament of Northern Ireland)
Members of the Privy Council of Northern Ireland
Members of the House of Commons of Northern Ireland for Belfast constituencies